Antiplanes thalaea is a species of sea snail, a marine gastropod mollusk in the family Pseudomelatomidae,.

Description
The length of the shell attains 40 mm, its diameter 12 mm.

(Original description) The solid, heavy shell has an elongate spire constricted at the sutures, and eight or more whorls. The protoconch is eroded. The surface is covered with a pale apple green periostracum, which fades in time to a greenish gray. The surface is sculptured only by incremental lines, faint spiral lines, a slight depression of the anal fasciole, and irregular, feeble, broken, short elevated lines which are scattered over the surface and usually directed at right angles to the incremental lines. The aperture is short and narrow, with a short and wide siphonal canal. The outer lip shows a deep anal sinuosity, leaving a slightly depressed fasciole behind it. The anterior part of the outer lip is much produced and rounded, thin and simple. The columella is stout, white, short, obliquely truncate in front. The siphonal canal is wide, short, slightly flaring. The base of the shell is somewhat constricted, with the spiral striae stronger than on the rest of the surface.

Distribution
This marine species occurs off California, USA.

References

 McLean J.H. (1996). The Prosobranchia. In: Taxonomic Atlas of the Benthic Fauna of the Santa Maria Basin and Western Santa Barbara Channel. The Mollusca Part 2 – The Gastropoda. Santa Barbara Museum of Natural History. volume 9: 1–160

External links
 
 

thalaea
Gastropods described in 1902